3M was a goal first proposed in the early 1980s by Raj Reddy and his colleagues at Carnegie Mellon University (CMU) as a minimum specification for academic/technical workstations: at least a megabyte of memory, a megapixel display and a million instructions per second (MIPS) processing power. It was also often said that it should cost no more than a "megapenny".

At that time a typical desktop computer such as an early IBM Personal Computer might have 1/8 of a megabyte of memory (128K), 1/4 of a million pixels (640400 monochrome display), and run at 1/3 million instructions per second ( 8088).

The concept was inspired by the Xerox Alto which had been designed in the 1970s at the Xerox Palo Alto Research Center. Several Altos were donated to CMU, Stanford, and MIT in 1979.
An early 3M computer was the PERQ Workstation made by Three Rivers Computer Corporation. The PERQ had a 1 million P-codes (Pascal instructions) per second processor, 256 KB of RAM (upgradeable to 1 MB), and a 768×1024 pixel display on a  display.  While not quite a true 3M machine, it was used as the initial 3M machine for the CMU Scientific Personal Integrated Computing Environment (SPICE) workstation project.

The Stanford University Network SUN workstation, designed by Andy Bechtolsheim in 1980, is another example. It was then commercialized by Sun Microsystems in 1982. Apollo Computer (in the Route 128 region) announced the Apollo/Domain computer in 1981.

The original NeXT Computer was introduced in 1988 as a 3M machine by Steve Jobs, who first heard this term at Brown University.

Modern desktop computers exceed the 3M memory and speed requirements by many thousands of times, however screen pixels are only 2 (in the case of 1080p) to 8 (in the case of 4K) times larger (but full color so each pixel uses at least 24 times as many bits).

References

History of computing hardware
Carnegie Mellon University
Computer workstations